Worgret Heath SSSI, Dorset is an 8.4 hectare biological Site of Special Scientific Interest in Dorset, notified in 1987.

The site has a large population of Sand Lizards.

Sources
 English Nature citation sheet for the site (accessed 31 August 2006)

External links
 English Nature website (SSSI information)

Sites of Special Scientific Interest in Dorset
Sites of Special Scientific Interest notified in 1987
Heathland Sites of Special Scientific Interest